Paul Anthony and Zach Bletz, known professionally as Gettoblaster, are two American house and techno producers from Detroit (Zach) and Chicago (Paul). Chicago is known for starting the house movement while Detroit pioneered the techno scene during the late 1980s. Gettoblaster's music conserves the genres of their respective birthplaces, combining techno and house to pioneer a unique style of ghetto house music. They have collaborated with well-established artists such as Bad Boy Bill, Steve "Silk" Hurley, DJ Funk, Roland Clark, and Chip E.

History 
Formed in 2014 Gettoblaster released their debut LP We Jack quickly followed by the launch of their record label, We Jack. the following year with the goal of showcasing other prominent house producers such as Bad Boy Bill and DJ Deeon. 2015 also marked the release of Gettoblaster's second LP, Diamonds & Palm Trees. In 2017 Gettoblaster toured Europe, making stops in London, Amsterdam, Paris, and beyond. 2018 saw Gettoblaster touring across the United States followed by the release of their single, Get Dat, on Claude VonStroke's Dirtybird Records in 2019.

Discography

Albums
2014
We Jack - The Album

2016
Chi Till I Die

2018
Pineapples & Palm Trees

EP's
2014
Gettotrax Vol 1

2015
Back 2 The Underground EP
Street Bleep

2016
Find My UFO
Club Beats

2017
Pimpin Hoes
Work That
Jello Booty
Bang to the Beat
Beat the Box / Bang It

2018
Bounce Back / Glock On My Strap
Let the Beat Control My Mind EP
Gettoblaster & Friends EP
Future Funk

Singles
2015
"Southside Groove ft. DJ Skip" - Gettoblaster, Andi Rivera

2016
"Deep In The Jungle" - Gettoblaster
"Freak Bitch" - Gettoblaster, DJ Deeon, Bitchin' Camero
"I Need Weed In My Life ft. DJ Dagwood" - Gettoblaster
"Look At You ft. Donnie Lesko" - Gettoblaster, ZXX
"Street Wise" - Gettoblaster

2017
"The Warehouse Project" - Gettoblaster
"Turn It Up ft. Benjamin Paper" - Gettoblaster, Rescue
"Stop & Go" - Gettoblaster
"Bounce Dat Ass ft. Volsto" - Gettoblaster
"Finger Bang ft. Servante" - Gettoblaster
"Work Hard" - Gettoblaster, Rescue
"Disco Strip Club" - Gettoblaster
"Bang The Box ft. Robert Armani" - Gettoblaster, Nigel Richards
"Tweeter Tot" - Gettoblaster
"Finger Bang ft. Servante" - Gettoblaster
"Housedog" - Gettoblaster, Fuzzy Cufflinxxx
"Butterflies" - Colette, Gettoblaster
"Flip The Script" - Gettoblaster
"Work It Out" - Gettoblaster
"Hustling For Horns" - Bad Boy Bill, Gettoblaster
"Make Um Hurt" - Gettoblaster, KE
"Disco Strip Club" - Gettoblaster
"Sex By The Fire" - Gettoblaster, Mellefresh
"Work Hard" - Gettoblaster, Rescue

2018
"Flip The Script" - Gettoblaster
"Bang Them Walls" - Bad Boy Bill, Gettoblaster ft. Benjamin Paper
"Shake It" - Gettoblaster, Black Tantra
"Knock Knock" - Gettoblaster, Fuzzy Cufflinxxx
"Get Money" - Gettoblaster
"I Don't Care" - Gettoblaster, Rescue
"Butterflies" - Colette, Gettoblaster
"Sack Of Weed" - Gettoblaster, Hatiras, Pressed & Proper
"Hustling For Horns" - Bad Boy Bill, Gettoblaster
"Fine Day" - Bad Boy Bill, Gettoblaster, ZXX, SKYLR
"Goin Deep" - Gettoblaster, Missy
"Fantasy ft. Missy" - Gettoblaster, Missy
"Don't Stop" - Gettoblaster, Mellefresh
"Do It" - Gettoblaster, Hazzaro
"Be A Freak" - Gettoblaster, Stephan Granville
"Jack To The Rhythm"  - Gettoblaster, Hatiras, Black Tantra
"What You About" - Gettoblaster, Just Alexander
"4am" - Gettoblaster, Missy
"Work This" - Gettoblaster, Don Rimini
"Be A Freak" - Gettoblaster, Stephan Granville
"What Is A Pimp?" - Gettoblaster, Hazzaro
"Goin Deep" - Gettoblaster, Missy
"Bounce That Shit" - Gettoblaster, ZXX, Rondell Adams

2019
"Jack To The Rhythm" - Gettoblaster, Hatiras, Black Tantra
"What You About" - Gettoblaster, Just Alexander
"Get Dat" - Gettoblaster, DJ Funk

Remixes
2014
"Work That Muthja Fucker (Gettoblaster & Robert Armani Remix)" - Steve Poindexter
"Circus Bells (Gettoblaster & HumanTraffik Remix)" - Robert Armani
"Ambulance (Gettoblaster Remix)" - Robert Armani

2015
"Autograph (Gettoblaster Remix)" - Hatiras, MC Flipside
"Barcodez (Gettoblaster Remix)" - DJ Deeon
"Conduction (Gettoblaster & Robert Armani Remix)" - Johnny Fiasco
"Koolaid (Gettoblaster Remix)" - Treasure Fingers
"Do It Like This (Gettoblaster Remix)" - Defunct!

2016
"Walking Down the Street (Gettoblaster Remix)" - Ron Carroll

2017
"Freak Somebody (Gettoblaster & ZXX Remix)" - Fatman Scoop, Freak Fineman
"Crush (Gettoblaster Remix)" - Colette
"TRU Skool (Gettoblaster Remix)" - Alex Peace, Brian Boncher
"Jens Sap (Gettoblaster Remix)" - Robert Palmero
"Baby Wants To Ride (Gettoblaster Remix)" - Jamie Principle
"We Feelin' It (Gettoblaster Remix)" - Vanilla Ace, Jean Bacarreza
"It's A Love Thang (Gettoblaster & ZXX Remix)" - Paul Johnson
"Music Is ft. Audacious Melodius (Gettoblaster & ZXX Remix)" - Ron Carroll ft. Audacious Melodius

2018
"Jack Is in the House (Gettoblaster Remix)" - Don Rimini
"How Low Can You Go ft. Mr. V (Gettoblaster Remix)" - Mr. V, Ramiro Bernabela
"Jack Is in the House (Gettoblaster Remix)" - Don Rimini
"I Just Can't (Gettoblaster Remix)" - Hatiras, Lee Wilson
"Coke Salt (Gettoblaster Remix)" - Figio's
"Get Get Down (Gettoblaster Remix)" - Paul Johnson
"It's On Again ft. Good Money (Gettoblaster Remix)" - DJ Godfather
"Big Dream (Gettoblaster & ZXX Remix)" - Ron Carroll, DJ Skip, Steve Silk Hurley, R.O.N.N, FAT V
"Money For That (Gettoblaster, Steve Gerard, Foxhovnd Remix)" - Nick Rockwell
"Deep House (Gettoblaster Remix)" - DJ Dagwood, Dajae
"I Get Deep (Gettoblaster Remix)" - Roland Clark
"T.N.T. (Gettoblaster Remix)" - Thomas Sahs

2019
"Big Dream (Gettoblaster & ZXX Remix)" - Ron Carroll, DJ Skip, Steve Silk Hurley, R.O.N.N, FAT V

References

External links 
Gettoblaster on Spotify
Tracks on Discogs
Gettoblaster on Soundcloud 
Gettoblaster Website

Record producers from Illinois
American musical duos
American techno musicians
American house musicians
Musicians from Chicago
Living people
Year of birth missing (living people)